Richard Chee Quee (born 4 January 1971) is an Australian former first-class cricketer.

Chee Quee is notable for being the second player of Chinese origin to play first-class cricket in Australia after Hunter Poon in 1923. He played from 1992–1993 to 2000–2001 for New South Wales and scored nearly 11,000 runs in Sydney grade cricket for the Randwick and Randwick Petersham club.

He was the lead vocalist in the rock band Six & Out. He also takes part in coaching clinics run by the Australian Cricket Association Masters team.

References

External links 
 

1971 births
Living people
Australian cricketers
New South Wales cricketers
Australian people of Chinese descent
Australian rock singers
Cricketers from Sydney
21st-century Australian singers
21st-century Australian male singers